Soronzonboldyn Battsetseg (born 3 May 1990) is Mongolia's first female gold medalist of the World Wrestling Championships. At the 2012 Olympic Games in London, she won bronze in women's 63 kg freestyle.  It was Mongolia's first medal in freestyle wrestling since the 1980 Summer Olympics. Battsetseg was the youngest ever world wrestling champion of Mongolia when she won in 2010 at the age of 20 years. Now Sükheegiin Tserenchimed is the youngest champion of Mongolia. She is a recipient of the Hero of Labour of Mongolia and the Order of Sukhbaatar.

References

External links
 
 
 
 Profile-bbc.co.uk
 

1990 births
Living people
Mongolian female sport wrestlers
Olympic bronze medalists for Mongolia
Wrestlers at the 2012 Summer Olympics
Wrestlers at the 2016 Summer Olympics
Olympic wrestlers of Mongolia
Olympic medalists in wrestling
Medalists at the 2012 Summer Olympics
People from Arkhangai Province
World Wrestling Championships medalists
Universiade medalists in wrestling
World Wrestling Champions
Universiade gold medalists for Mongolia
Medalists at the 2013 Summer Universiade
Wrestlers at the 2020 Summer Olympics
21st-century Mongolian women